BBC Player is an authenticated multi-genre subscription video on demand service operated by BBC Studios, formerly BBC Worldwide, for the Asia market. It is available online and as an app.

The service debuted in Singapore in summer 2016 to StarHub subscribers, in Malaysia in March 2017 with Telekom Malaysia, and in Poland in June 2022 with Canal+.

BBC Player offers curated content from BBC global brands – BBC Earth, BBC First, BBC Lifestyle, CBeebies and BBC World News. For the first time in Asia, BBC Brit is also available exclusively on BBC Player.

The most popular British programmes are available through the service, including Top Gear, Doctor Who, The Great British Bake Off and Sherlock.

References 

Media players
Internet television channels
Streaming media systems
BBC